The University College of Engineering, Osmania University (UCE) is an autonomous engineering college located in Hyderabad, India. The college offers undergraduate B.E. and postgraduate M.E. courses.

History
Established in 1929 the University College of Engineering is the oldest and the biggest in Telangana. Established in 1929, eleven years after the formation of Osmania University, it was the sixth engineering college to be established in the whole of British India.

The college moved to its present permanent building in 1947.  Today it is the biggest among the campus colleges of Osmania University.

The college was conferred autonomous status in 1994.

Departments
The college has the following departments:
 Artificial intelligence and Machine Learning
 Biomedical Engineering
 Civil Engineering
 Computer Science and Engineering
 Electrical Engineering
 Electronics and Communication Engineering
 Mechanical Engineering
 Mining Engineering
 Chemistry
 Physics
 English
 Mathematics

Ranking 

Among government engineering colleges in India, UCE was ranked 24 by Outlook India in 2021. It was ranked 88 among engineering colleges by the National Institutional Ranking Framework (NIRF) in 2020.

References

External links
 Official website

Engineering colleges in Hyderabad, India
Engineering colleges in Telangana
Colleges affiliated to Osmania University
Education in the princely states of India
1929 establishments in India
Educational institutions established in 1929